The Petascelini are a tribe of leaf-footed bugs, in the subfamily Coreinae erected (as "Petascelaria") by Carl Stål in 1873.  Many genera are from tropical Africa including the type genus Petascelis, but some are from South-East Asia. Ahmad gives key to the tribes of Coreinae including these genera.

Genera 
The Coreoidea Species File lists:
 Aurivilliana Distant, 1881
 Carlisis Stål, 1858
 Dilycochtha Karsch, 1895
 Neotrematocoris Ahmad, 1979 - Bangladesh
 Oxypristis Signoret, 1861 - Madagascar
 Petascelis Signoret, 1847 - type genus, sub-Saharan Africa
 Petascelisca Distant, 1881
 Petillia Stål, 1865
 Petillocoris Hsiao, 1963 - China
 Petillopsis Hsiao, 1963 - India to Myanmar
 Sulpicia (bug) Stål, 1866
 Trematocoris Mayr, 1865 - India, China, Thailand, Malesia
 Zenkeria (bug) Karsch, 1895

References

External links
 
 

Hemiptera tribes
Coreinae